
Gmina Rewal is a rural gmina (administrative district) in Gryfice County, West Pomeranian Voivodeship, in north-western Poland.

Villages
Gmina Rewal contains the villages and settlements of Niechorze, Pobierowo, Pogorzelica, Pustkowo, Rewal, Śliwin and Trzęsacz.

Neighbouring gminas
Gmina Rewal is bordered by the gminas of Dziwnów, Karnice, Świerzno and Trzebiatów.

References
Polish official population figures 2006

Rewal
Gryfice County